William L. Palms (born October 6, 1972), known as Willie Palms, is an American professional boxer.

Amateur career
Palms had a stellar amateur career, and won the U.S. National Championships as Super Heavyweight champion in 1997.

Professional career
Palms turned pro in 1997 and won his first nine bouts, before losing a decision to Jean-Francois Bergeron in 2001.  Palms evolved from amateur prospect to heavyweight journeyman, later losing a decision to Elieser Castillo in 2002 and Duncan Dokiwari in 2006.

On July 31, 2009 he was defeated by Timur Ibragimov by technical knockout in the 5th round and which he was down twice in the 3rd and once in the 5th before the referee stopped the fight.

Professional boxing record

|-
|align="center" colspan=8|10 Wins (5 knockouts, 5 decisions), 10 Losses (4 knockouts, 6 decisions), 1 Draw 
|-
| align="center" style="border-style: none none solid solid; background: #e3e3e3"|Result
| align="center" style="border-style: none none solid solid; background: #e3e3e3"|Record
| align="center" style="border-style: none none solid solid; background: #e3e3e3"|Opponent
| align="center" style="border-style: none none solid solid; background: #e3e3e3"|Type
| align="center" style="border-style: none none solid solid; background: #e3e3e3"|Round
| align="center" style="border-style: none none solid solid; background: #e3e3e3"|Date
| align="center" style="border-style: none none solid solid; background: #e3e3e3"|Location
| align="center" style="border-style: none none solid solid; background: #e3e3e3"|Notes
|-
|Loss
|
|align=left| Maurice Byarm
|TKO
|5
|23/04/2011
|align=left| Washington, D.C., U.S.
|align=left|
|-
|Loss
|
|align=left| Craig Tomlinson
|UD
|4
|04/12/2009
|align=left| Reading, Pennsylvania, U.S.
|align=left|
|-
|Loss
|
|align=left| Timur Ibragimov
|TKO
|5
|31/07/2009
|align=left| Atlantic City, New Jersey, U.S.
|align=left|
|-
|Loss
|
|align=left| Alexis Mejias
|UD
|6
|19/06/2009
|align=left| Dover, New Jersey, U.S.
|align=left|
|-
|Loss
|
|align=left| Adam Richards
|TKO
|6
|20/01/2007
|align=left| Tunica, Mississippi, U.S.
|align=left|
|-
|Loss
|
|align=left| Duncan Dokiwari
|TKO
|4
|01/12/2006
|align=left| Laughlin, Nevada, U.S.
|align=left|
|-
|Loss
|
|align=left| Roderick Willis
|UD
|6
|10/06/2006
|align=left| Atlantic City, New Jersey, U.S.
|align=left|
|-
|Loss
|
|align=left| Elieser Castillo
|MD
|6
|07/06/2002
|align=left| Las Vegas, Nevada, U.S.
|align=left|
|-
|Loss
|
|align=left| Sedreck Fields
|UD
|6
|29/03/2002
|align=left| Las Vegas, Nevada, U.S.
|align=left|
|-
|Win
|
|align=left| Tali Kulihaapai
|UD
|6
|18/01/2002
|align=left| Las Vegas, Nevada, U.S.
|align=left|
|-
|Draw
|
|align=left| David Vedder
|PTS
|6
|13/10/2001
|align=left| Stateline, Nevada, U.S.
|align=left|
|-
|Loss
|
|align=left| Jean Francois Bergeron
|UD
|6
|28/09/2001
|align=left| Las Vegas, Nevada, U.S.
|align=left|
|-
|Win
|
|align=left| Derrell Dixon
|KO
|5
|20/07/2001
|align=left| Las Vegas, Nevada, U.S.
|align=left|
|-
|Win
|
|align=left| Stacy Frazier
|TKO
|3
|28/04/2001
|align=left| New York City, New York, U.S.
|align=left|
|-
|Win
|
|align=left| Moises Droz
|UD
|4
|10/03/2001
|align=left| Las Vegas, Nevada, U.S.
|align=left|
|-
|Win
|
|align=left| Errol Sadikovski
|TKO
|3
|04/11/2000
|align=left| New York City, New York, U.S.
|align=left|
|-
|Win
|
|align=left| Andrei Kopilou
|UD
|4
|14/09/2000
|align=left| New York City, New York, U.S.
|align=left|
|-
|Win
|
|align=left| Jason Brownlee
|DQ
|3
|27/07/2000
|align=left| New York City, New York, U.S.
|align=left|
|-
|Win
|
|align=left| Damon Saulbury
|MD
|4
|29/06/2000
|align=left| New York City, New York, U.S.
|align=left|
|-
|Win
|
|align=left| Shawn Hobbs
|TKO
|3
|11/09/1997
|align=left| Mashantucket, Connecticut, U.S.
|align=left|
|-
|Win
|
|align=left| José Felipe Colón
|TKO
|1
|02/08/1997
|align=left| Uncasville, Connecticut, U.S.
|align=left|
|}

External links
 

1972 births
Living people
Boxers from New Jersey
Heavyweight boxers
Sportspeople from Jersey City, New Jersey
Winners of the United States Championship for amateur boxers
American male boxers